Judolia sexspilota is a species of beetle in the family Cerambycidae. It was described by John Lawrence LeConte in 1859.

References

S
Beetles described in 1859